is a compilation album by Japanese entertainer Akina Nakamori, released through Universal Music Japan on December 4, 2002 to commemorate Nakamori's 20th anniversary. Produced by Nakamori and Satoshi Takebe, the album consists of self-covers of her singles from the Warner Pioneer era in different styles such as jazz, big band, salsa, tango, ska, and bossa nova.

Background
In mid-September 2002, Nakamori planned to release an original album by the end of the year, but following her summer tour, she decided to revisit her old hits as part of her 20th anniversary celebration. The album features collaborations with Yōichi Murata, Ken Morimura from Orquesta del Sol, Masahiko Kitahara from Tokyo Ska Paradise Orchestra, and Akira Senju.

The album cover features an illustration of Nakamori cosplaying as Jessica Rabbit as a play on the album title using the initials "D.D".

Nakamori performed the new version of "Kazari ja Nai no yo Namida wa" on NHK's 53rd Kōhaku Uta Gassen, making her first appearance on the New Year's Eve special in 14 years.

Charting performance
The album peaked at No. 8 on Oricon's weekly albums chart and charted for 10 weeks. It sold over 83,000 copies.

Track listing

Charts

References

External links
 
 
 

2002 compilation albums
Akina Nakamori compilation albums
Japanese-language compilation albums
Self-covers albums
Universal Music Japan compilation albums